Exocarpos syrticola (common name coastal ballart, coast ballart) belongs to the sandalwood plant family (Santalaceae). It is a species endemic to Australia and found on the coastal fringes of Victoria, Tasmania, and South Australia.

It was first described in 1856 by Ferdinand von Mueller as Exocarpos strictus var. syrticola, and given species status in 1959 by  Hans Ulrich Stauffer.

References

External links

Exocarpos syrticola occurrence data from Australasian Virtual Herbarium
Exocarpos syrticola images on Flickr

Bushfood
syrticola
Flora of South Australia
Flora of Victoria (Australia)
Flora of Tasmania
Plants described in 1856
Endemic flora of Australia
Taxa named by Ferdinand von Mueller
Taxa named by Friedrich Anton Wilhelm Miquel